Mohammad Al Mulla (born in 1988) is an Emirati astronaut. He has been selected in April 2021. He will train along the NASA Astronaut Group 23 of astronauts to the function of international mission specialist.

He is a pilot and leads the Training Department at the Air Wing Center at Dubai Police.

See also 

 Timeline of space travel by nationality
 UAE Space Agency

References

Further reading 
 

Living people
1988 births
Emirati astronauts